Southern Aroostook Community School is a public k-12 school in Dyer Brook, Maine, United States. It serves the towns of Crystal, Dyer Brook, Island Falls, Merrill, Oakfield and Smyrna, Maine.

History
After 25 years of work, Southern Aroostook Community School was built and opened in April 1976 at a cost of $3 million. It was intended to educate 750 students and employ 36 teachers as well as administration and support staff. The facility also includes a gymnasium which can accommodate 900 people and a modern library. Southern Aroostook's sports teams, Warriors and Lady Warriors play soccer, basketball, and baseball and softball. In 2018, the Lady Warriors high school basketball team competed for and won the Maine state Class D championship against the Vinalhaven Vikings. This was the school's first state championship title in 23 years.

References

Public high schools in Maine
Schools in Aroostook County, Maine
Buildings and structures completed in 1976
Public middle schools in Maine
Public elementary schools in Maine